Valentin Henry (born 18 September 1993) is a French professional footballer who plays for Sochaux as a midfielder.

Club career
On 14 June 2021, he joined Sochaux on a two-year contract.

References

1993 births
Sportspeople from Brest, France
Footballers from Brittany
Living people
French footballers
Association football midfielders
Stade Brestois 29 players
Rodez AF players
FC Sochaux-Montbéliard players
Ligue 2 players
Championnat National 3 players